Michel Kammoun (born in Sierra Leone) is a Lebanese-French film director. He is mostly known for his 2006 feature film Falafel, which won Golden Bayard for Best Film in 2006 Festival International du Film Francophone de Namur.

Career
After studying architecture, Michel Kammoun joined
the film school ESEC in Paris. He has written and directed many short
films. His films participated in many international festivals and were
distributed in numerous countries such as USA, Canada, Latin America,
Switzerland, Singapore, Spain, Germany, Belgium, Italy, France. He also
directed commercials and held screen-writing workshops. Today, Michel
Kammoun lives between Beirut and Paris. His first feature film Falafel
has won nine International Awards, participated in prestigious film
festivals worldwide and earned international acclamation.

Filmography
Cathodique (1993)
Shadows (1995)
The Shower (1999)
Clowning Around/The Vanishing Rabbits (2003)
Falafel (2006)
Beirut Hold'em (2019)

Awards
Falafel
Golden Bayard for Best Film - NAMUR International Film Festival,Belgium 2006.
Golden Bayard for Best Music - NAMUR International Film Festival, Belgium 2006.
Prix spécial du Jury at the 2008 Festival du Premier Film d'Annonay (France).
Palmera de Bronce for Best Film, - XXVIII MOSTRA de VALENCIA, Spain 2007.
Audience Award - LILLE International Film Festival, France 2007.
Best First Film Award - ROTTERDAM Arab Film Festival, Nederland 2007.
ART AWARD (Best First Film Award) - ALEXANDRIA International Film Festival, Egypt 2007.
Bronze Dagger for Best Film, Muscat International Film Festival, Oman 2008.
Silver Muhr for Best Film - DUBAI International Film Festival, UAE 2006.

Reviews
Variety (USA)
Cinebel (Belgium)
Euromedcafe (France)
Filmstart (Germany)
Flickfilosopher (USA)
Kino-zeit (Germany)
Le Monde (France)
Les Inrocks (France)
Liberation (France)
Mulderville (France)
NewYorkCool (USA)
Screen International (UK)
Septimovicio (Spain)
The Australian (Australia)

References

External links
Official Website
Falafel's Website

Living people
Lebanese film directors
Year of birth missing (living people)